The Cook Islands Labor Party was a political party in the Cook Islands.  It was formed just before the 1965 election and ran seven candidates on Rarotonga, winning 5% of the vote. None of its candidates were successful, and the party quickly faded from view.

References

Labour parties
Political parties established in 1965
Defunct political parties in the Cook Islands